Component-based software engineering (CBSE), also called component-based development (CBD), is a branch of software engineering that emphasizes the separation of concerns with respect to the wide-ranging functionality available throughout a given software system. It is a reuse-based approach to defining, implementing and composing loosely coupled independent components into systems. This practice aims to bring about an equally wide-ranging degree of benefits in both the short-term and the long-term for the software itself and for organizations that sponsor such software.

Software engineering practitioners regard components as part of the starting platform for service-orientation. Components play this role, for example, in web services, and more recently, in service-oriented architectures (SOA), whereby a component is converted by the web service into a service and subsequently inherits further characteristics beyond that of an ordinary component.

Components can produce or consume events and can be used for event-driven architectures (EDA).

Definition and characteristics of components 
An individual software component is a software package, a web service, a web resource, or a module that encapsulates a set of related functions (or data).

All system processes are placed into separate components so that all of the data and functions inside each component are semantically related (just as with the contents of classes). Because of this principle, it is often said that components are modular and cohesive.

With regard to system-wide co-ordination, components communicate with each other via interfaces. When a component offers services to the rest of the system, it adopts a provided interface that specifies the services that other components can utilize, and how they can do so. This interface can be seen as a signature of the component - the client does not need to know about the inner workings of the component (implementation) in order to make use of it. This principle results in components referred to as encapsulated. The UML illustrations within this article represent provided interfaces by a lollipop-symbol attached to the outer edge of the component.

However, when a component needs to use another component in order to function, it adopts a used interface that specifies the services that it needs. In the UML illustrations in this article, used interfaces are represented by an open socket symbol attached to the outer edge of the component.

Another important attribute of components is that they are substitutable, so that a component can replace another (at design time or run-time), if the successor component meets the requirements of the initial component (expressed via the interfaces). Consequently, components can be replaced with either an updated version or an alternative without breaking the system in which the component operates.

As a rule of thumb for engineers substituting components, component B can immediately replace component A, if component B provides at least what component A provided and uses no more than what component A used.

Software components often take the form of objects (not classes) or collections of objects (from object-oriented programming), in some binary or textual form, adhering to some interface description language (IDL) so that the component may exist autonomously from other components in a computer. In other words, a component acts without changing its source code. Although the behavior of the component's source code may change based on the application's extensibility, provided by its writer.

When a component is to be accessed or shared across execution contexts or network links, techniques such as serialization or marshalling are often employed to deliver the component to its destination.

Reusability is an important characteristic of a high-quality software component. Programmers should design and implement software components in such a way that many different programs can reuse them. Furthermore, component-based usability testing should be considered when software components directly interact with users.

It takes significant effort and awareness to write a software component that is effectively reusable. The component needs to be:
 fully documented
 thoroughly tested
 robust - with comprehensive input-validity checking
 able to pass back appropriate error messages or return codes
 designed with an awareness that it will be put to unforeseen uses

In the 1960s, programmers built scientific subroutine libraries that were reusable in a broad array of engineering and scientific applications. Though these subroutine libraries reused well-defined algorithms in an effective manner, they had a limited domain of application. Commercial sites routinely created application programs from reusable modules written in assembly language, COBOL, PL/1 and other second- and third-generation languages using both system and user application libraries.

, modern reusable components encapsulate both data structures and the algorithms that are applied to the data structures. Component-based software engineering builds on prior theories of software objects, software architectures, software frameworks and software design patterns, and the extensive theory of object-oriented programming and the object-oriented design of all these. It claims that software components, like the idea of hardware components, used for example in telecommunications, can ultimately be made interchangeable and reliable. On the other hand, it is argued that it is a mistake to focus on independent components rather than the framework (without which they would not exist).

History
The idea that software should be componentized - built from prefabricated components - first became prominent with Douglas McIlroy's address at the NATO conference on software engineering in Garmisch, Germany, 1968, titled Mass Produced Software Components. The conference set out to counter the so-called software crisis. McIlroy's subsequent inclusion of pipes and filters into the Unix operating system was the first implementation of an infrastructure for this idea.

Brad Cox of Stepstone largely defined the modern concept of a software component. He called them Software ICs and set out to create an infrastructure and market for these components by inventing the Objective-C programming language. (He summarizes this view in his book Object-Oriented Programming - An Evolutionary Approach 1986.)

The software components are used in two different contexts and two kinds: i) using components as parts to build a single executable, or ii) each executable is treated as a component in a distributed environment, where components collaborate with each other using internet or intranet communication protocols for IPC (Inter Process Communications). The above belongs to former kind, while the below belongs to later kind.

IBM led the path with their System Object Model (SOM) in the early 1990s. As a reaction, Microsoft paved the way for actual deployment of component software with Object linking and embedding (OLE) and Component Object Model (COM).  many successful software component models exist.

In 2021 open-source toolchain Bit provided a free infrastructure for the development and composition of components into software applications, products, services and systems.

Architecture

A computer running several software components is often called an application server. This combination of application servers and software components is usually called distributed computing. Typical real-world application of this is in, e.g., financial applications or business software.

Component models
A component model is a definition of properties that components must satisfy, methods and mechanisms for the composition of components.

During the last decades, researchers and practitioners have proposed several component models with different characteristics. A classification of the existing component models is given in. Examples of component models are: Enterprise JavaBeans (EJB) model, Component Object Model (COM) model, .NET model, X-MAN component model, and Common Object Request Broker Architecture  (CORBA) component model.

Technologies

 Business object technologies
 Newi
 Component-based software frameworks for specific domains
 Advanced Component Framework
 Earth System Modeling Framework (ESMF)
 MASH IoT Platform for Asset Management
 KOALA component model developed for software in consumer electronics
 React (JavaScript library)
 Software Communications Architecture (JTRS SCA)
 Component-oriented programming
 Bundles as defined by the OSGi Service Platform
 Component Object Model (OCX/ActiveX/COM) and DCOM from Microsoft
 TASCS - SciDAC Center for Technology for Advanced Scientific Component Software
 Eiffel programming language
 Enterprise JavaBeans from Sun Microsystems (now Oracle)
 Flow-based programming
 Fractal component model from ObjectWeb
 MidCOM component framework for Midgard and PHP
 Oberon, Component Pascal, and BlackBox Component Builder
 rCOS method of component-based model driven design from UNU-IIST
 SOFA component system from ObjectWeb
 The System.ComponentModel namespace in Microsoft .NET
 Unity developed by Unity Technologies
 Unreal Engine developed by Epic Games
 UNO from the OpenOffice.org office suite
 VCL and CLX from Borland and similar free LCL library.
 XPCOM from Mozilla Foundation
 Compound document technologies
 Active Documents in Oberon System and BlackBox Component Builder
 KParts, the KDE compound document technology
 Object linking and embedding (OLE)
 OpenDoc
 Distributed computing software components
.NET Remoting from Microsoft
 9P distributed protocol developed for Plan 9, and used by Inferno and other systems.
 CORBA and the CORBA Component Model from the Object Management Group
 D-Bus from the freedesktop.org organization
 DCOM and later versions of COM (and COM+) from Microsoft
 DSOM and SOM from IBM (now scrapped)
 Ice from ZeroC
 Java EE from Sun
 Kompics from SICS
 Universal Network Objects (UNO) from OpenOffice.org
 Web services
 REST
 Zope from Zope Corporation
 AXCIOMA (the component framework for distributed, real-time, and embedded systems) by Remedy IT
 COHORTE the cross-platform runtime for executing and managing robust and reliable distributed Service-oriented Component-based applications, by isandlaTech
DX-MAN Service Model
 Generic programming emphasizes separation of algorithms from data representation
 Interface description languages (IDLs)
 Open Service Interface Definitions (OSIDs)
 Part of both COM and CORBA
 Platform-Independent Component Modeling Language
 SIDL - Scientific Interface Definition Language
 Part of the Babel Scientific Programming Language Interoperability System (SIDL and Babel are core technologies of the CCA and the SciDAC TASCS Center - see above.)
 SOAP IDL from World Wide Web Consortium (W3C)
 WDDX
 XML-RPC, the predecessor of SOAP
 Inversion of control (IoC) and Plain Old C++/Java Object (POCO/POJO) component frameworks
 Pipes and filters
 Unix operating system

See also
 Business logic
 Modular programming
 Service Component Architecture (SCA)
 Software Communications Architecture (JTRS SCA)
 Third-party software component
 Web service
 Web components

References

Further reading
 Brad J. Cox, Andrew J. Novobilski (1991). Object-Oriented Programming: An Evolutionary Approach. 2nd ed. Addison-Wesley, Reading 
 Bertrand Meyer (1997). Object-Oriented Software Construction. 2nd ed. Prentice Hall.
 George T. Heineman, William T. Councill (2001). Component-Based Software Engineering: Putting the Pieces Together. Addison-Wesley Professional, Reading 2001 
 Richard Veryard (2001). Component-based business : plug and play. London : Springer. 
 Clemens Szyperski, Dominik Gruntz, Stephan Murer (2002). Component Software: Beyond Object-Oriented Programming. 2nd ed. ACM Press - Pearson Educational, London 2002

External links
 Why Software Reuse has Failed and How to Make It Work for You by Douglas C. Schmidt
 What is the True essence and reality of CBD? (Evidence to show existing CBD paradigm is flawed)
 comprehensive list of Component Systems on SourceForge
 Brief Introduction to Real COP (Component Oriented Programming) by Using a small GUI application as an example

 
Object-oriented programming
Software architecture
Software engineering